Emmanuel Ngom Priso (born 15 December 1984) is a Cameroonian-born French athlete specialising in the sprinting events. Most of his successes came in the 4 x 100 metres relay.

Competition record

Personal bests
Outdoor
100 metres – 10.28 (+1.9 m/s) (Tomblaine 2006)
200 metres – 21.21 (-0.8 m.s) (Eaubonne 2007)
Indoor
60 metres – 6.63 (Liévin 2009)
200 metres – 21.16 (Eaubonne 2007)

References
 

1984 births
Living people
French male sprinters
Cameroonian male sprinters
Cameroonian emigrants to France
Athletes (track and field) at the 2006 Commonwealth Games
Commonwealth Games competitors for Cameroon
Mediterranean Games silver medalists for France
Mediterranean Games medalists in athletics
Athletes (track and field) at the 2009 Mediterranean Games
Black French sportspeople
Athletes (track and field) at the 2003 All-Africa Games
African Games competitors for Cameroon